The Tanzanian records in swimming are the fastest ever performances of swimmers from Tanzania, which are recognised and ratified by the Tanzanian Swimming Federation.

Long Course (50 m)

Men

Women

Short Course (25 m)

Men

Women

Mixed relay

References

Tanzania
Records
Swimming